Pamarru may refer to:

Pamarru, Krishna district, a village in Krishna district, Andhra Pradesh, India
Pamarru, East Godavari district, a village in East Godavari district, Andhra Pradesh, India
Pamarru mandal, a mandal in Krishna district, Andhra Pradesh, India